Carex muskingumensis is a species of sedge known by the common name Muskingum sedge. It is native primarily to the Midwestern United States where it is found in wet areas such as swamps, low woods, and sedge meadows. It is a fairly conservative species, usually being found in areas where native vegetation is intact.

References

muskingumensis
Plants described in 1824